Kasegawa Dam is a concrete gravity dam located in Saga Prefecture in Japan. The dam is used for water supply, irrigation and power generation. The catchment area of the dam is 128.4 km2. The dam impounds about 270  ha of land when full and can store 71000 thousand cubic meters of water. The construction of the dam was started on 1973 and completed in 2011.

References

Dams in Saga Prefecture
2011 establishments in Japan